The vice-chancellor (Upacharyas) is the executive head of Visva-Bharati University.

Vice-chancellors of Visva-Bharati
The vice-chancellors of Visva-Bharati University are as follows.
 Rathindranath Tagore (1951–1953)
 Kshitimohan Sen (1953–1954) (acting)
 Prabodh Chandra Bagchi (1954–1956)
 Indira Devi Chaudhurani (1956-1956) (acting)
 Satyendranath Bose (1956–1958)
 Kshitishchandra Chaudhuri (1958–1959) (acting)
 Sudhi Ranjan Das (1959–1965)
 Kalidas Bhattacharya (1966–1970)
 Pratul Chandra Gupta (1970–1975)
 Surajit Chandra Sinha (1975–1980)
 Amlan Dutta (1980–1984)
 Nemai Sadhan Basu (1984–1989)
 Ajit Kumar Chakrabarty (1989–1990) (acting)
 Ashin Dasgupta (1990–1991)
 Sisir Mukhopadhyaya (1991-1991) (acting)
 Sabyasachi Bhattacharya (1991–1995)
 Sisir Mukhopadhyaya (1995-1995) (acting)
 R.R. Rao (1995-1995) (acting)
 Dilip K. Sinha (1995–2001)
 Sujit Basu (2001–2006)
 Rajat Kanta Ray (2006–2011)
 Sushanta Kumar Dattagupta, (Sep 2011–Feb 2016)
 Swapan Kumar Datta (Feb 2016-Jan 2018) (Offg.)
 Sabuj Kali Sen (Feb 2018-Oct 2018) (Offg.)
 Bidyut Chakrabarty (Oct 2018-Incumbent)

References 

Vice-Chancellors by university in India
Academic staff of Visva-Bharati University